The 2003 All-Africa Games football – Women's tournament was the 1st edition of the African Games men's football tournament for women. The football tournament was held in Abuja, Nigeria between 3–16 October 2003 as part of the 2003 All-Africa Games. It was played by players under the age of 23.
Nigeria won the final against South Africa.

Participating teams
No qualifying took part, but teams were invited. Nigeria and Ghana were seeded and put in different groups. Ghana then withdraw on short notice and were to be replaced by Nigeria's A national team, but that was withdrawn later too, due to lack of funding from the Nigerian FA. DR Congo then took part at a last minute replacement.

Squads

Final tournament
All times given as local time (UTC+1)

Group stage

Group A

Group B

Knockout stage

Semifinals

Third-place match

Final

Final ranking

See also
Football at the 2003 All-Africa Games – Men's tournament

References

External links
2003 All-Africa Games – Women's tournament - rsssf.com

Tournament